The 1963 Asian Cycling Championships took place at the Stadium Merdeka in Kuala Lumpur, Selangor, Malaya from 2 to 8 June 1963.

Medal summary

Road

Track

Medal table

References
 The Straits Times, 3 June 1963, Page 16
 The Straits Times, 4 June 1963, Page 19
 The Straits Times, 5 June 1963, Page 18
 The Straits Times, 6 June 1963, Page 15
 The Straits Times, 7 June 1963, Page 17
 The Straits Times, 8 June 1963, Page 17
 The Straits Times, 9 June 1963, Page 12

External links
 www.asiancycling.com

Asia
Asia
Cycling
Asian Cycling Championships
1963 in Asian sport
International cycle races hosted by Malaysia
June 1963 sports events in Asia